Ben Watson (born 5 June 1997) is a British professional motocross rider.

References

External links
 Ben Watson at MXGP web site
 Ben Watson at Monster Energy Yamaha Factory web site
 

Living people
1997 births
British motocross riders